The Dreamer is the second studio album released by American country music artist Blake Shelton. Released in 2003 on Warner Bros. Records Nashville, it features the Number One single "The Baby," as well as the singles "Heavy Liftin'" and "Playboys of the Southwestern World". The Dreamer is certified gold by the Recording Industry Association of America and features staff writers on all but one track.

Content
"The Baby" was the first single from the album. This song spent three weeks at Number One on the Billboard country charts in early 2003, becoming Shelton's second Number One hit. Unlike with his debut album, the second and third singles from The Dreamer did not peak as highly: "Heavy Liftin'" peaked at number 32, and "Playboys of the Southwestern World" at number 24.

"Georgia in a Jug" was previously recorded by Johnny Paycheck on his 1978 album Take This Job and Shove It, and his version was a number 20 country hit that year.  "In My Heaven" was previously recorded by Mark Wills on his 2001 album Loving Every Minute.

Shelton's one solo writing credit on the album is for the title track, which is about Shelton's relationship with his then-fiance Kaynette Gern. "My Neck of the Woods" was co-written by Shelton and was inspired by the music of Hank Williams Jr. The lyrics to the song are about the area in Tennessee where Shelton was living at the time. Shelton said about "My Neck of the Woods", "This is a song I begged and begged to have on my first album, but I just couldn't convince the record company. Now I'm glad it didn't make the first album, because I think it fits better on this one."

Critical reception
Robert L. Doerschuk of Allmusic rated the album three stars out of five, saying, "Rough, rawboned energy drives Blake Shelton's sophomore release[…]the problem lies more with the material, which represents the doldrum state of songwriting in music city." Ray Waddell of Billboard thought that the album's variety of material made it "broader than its predecessor", contrasting the "muscular" "Heavy Liftin'" to the "impressive passion" on "The Baby", although he criticized the production of "Asphalt Cowboy".

Track listing

Personnel 
As listed in liner notes.

  Blake Shelton – lead vocals, backing vocals, acoustic guitar
 Bobby Braddock – keyboards, string arrangements 
 Tim Lauer – keyboards, string arrangements and conductor 
 Mike Rojas – keyboards
 Brent Rowan – Wurlitzer electric piano, electric guitars, baritone guitar
 John Willis – acoustic guitar
 Russ Pahl – banjo
 Jonathan Yudkin – mandolin, fiddle
 Dan Dugmore – steel guitar
 Paul Franklin – steel guitar
 Alison Prestwood – bass
 Michael Rhodes – bass 
 Shannon Forrest – drums, percussion
 Greg Morrow – drums, percussion
 Charlie McCoy – harmonica, trumpet, vibraphone
 Rob Hajacos – fiddle
 John Catchings – cello
 Anthony LaMarchina – cello 
 Carole Neuen-Rabinowitz – cello 
 Jim Grosjean – viola
 Kristin Wilkinson – viola 
 David Angell – violin
 David Davidson – violin 
 Carl Gorodetzky – violin
 Pamela Sixfin – violin 
 Donald Teal – violin 
 Mary Kathryn Vanosdale – violin 
 Larry Cordle – backing vocals
 Neal Coty – backing vocals
 Melodie Crittenden – backing vocals
 Wes Hightower – backing vocals
 Blue Miller – backing vocals
 Danny Myrick – backing vocals
 John Rich – backing vocals
 John Wesley Ryles – backing vocals
 Leslie Satcher – backing vocals
 Sharon Vaughn Bellamy – backing vocals
 Dennis Wilson – backing vocals

Production 
 Bobby Braddock – producer 
 Paige Levy – A&R 
 Ed Seay – engineer, mixing 
 Paul Hart – additional engineer, assistant engineer 
 John Saylor – assistant engineer
 Hank Williams – mastering at MasterMix (Nashville, Tennessee)
 Milly Catignani – production coordinator 
 Janice Arzak – art direction 
 Garrett Rittenberry – design
 Kristin Barlowe – photography 
 Debbie Dover – grooming 
 Katherine LePore – stylist

Chart performance

Weekly charts

Year-end charts

Singles

Certifications

References

External links
 "The Dreamer - Blake Shelton - Cut By Cut" on About.com

2003 albums
Blake Shelton albums
Warner Records albums